Chemical signalling may refer to:
Chemical signalling between cells, or cell signalling
Chemical signalling between animals, or olfactory communication